Bhawana is a city in Punjab, Pakistan

Bhawana may also refer to:

 Bhawana Tehsil, a tehsil of Chiniot District in Punjab, Pakistan
 Bhawanathpur (Vidhan Sabha constituency), a constituency in India

People
 Bhawana Somaaya, Indian film journalist, critic and historian.

See also